Nothing Lasts Forever is a 1994 novel by Sidney Sheldon.

This medical thriller tells the story of three female doctors trying to prove themselves in a profession dominated by men. Each of them has their own story, and each of their tales are  well connected and intertwined with each other.  But suddenly there is chaos, one dies, another is about to get the hospital shut down, and the third faces the  death penalty for murder.

The story was turned into a CBS miniseries, from the executive producer David Gerber. It starred Brooke Shields, Vanessa Williams and Gail O'Grady.

References

External links
 SidneySheldon.com|Bookshelf

1994 American novels
American thriller novels
Medical novels
American novels adapted into television shows
Novels by Sidney Sheldon